Kaocen Ag Geda (1880–1919) (also known as Kaocen, Kaosen, Kawsen) was a Tuareg noble and clan leader. Born in 1880 near  wadi Tamazlaght Aïr (modern Niger), Kaocen  from tribe of Ikazkazan berber, a subset of the Kel Owey confederation. He led the Kaocen revolt, a rebellion against French colonial rule of the area around the Aïr Mountains of northern Niger, during 1916–17. After the defeat of the revolt, Kaocen fled north; he was captured and hanged in 1919 by local forces in Mourzouk, Libya.

Family
Born into the wuro's family tribe of Ikazkazan Tuareg in what is now (Aïr Mountains) the north of Niger, his exact lineage is debated.  His brother Mokhtar Kodogo was his second in command throughout his life, and survived only a year after his death, killed while leading a revolt amongst the Toubou Fula in the Sultanate of Damagaram.

Resistance to French

An adherent to the militantly anti-French Sanusiya Sufi religious order, Kaocen engaged in numerous, mostly unsuccessful battles against French forces from at least 1909. He raided French columns in what is today eastern Niger and western Chad.  He participated in several raids in the Borkou, Ennedi and Tibesti area, including  the 1909 battle at Galakka.  Under the direct orders of the Sanusiya leader, he commanded forces at Ennedi in 1910, only to be defeated by the French and forced to retreat to the border of Darfur. Returning first to Ounianga Kabir then the Fezzan (the center of Sanusiya power), Kaocen rallied both tribal subjects and other nomads (not all Tuareg) who were loyal to the Sanusiya.

There, in October 1914, the Sanusiya leadership  declared a jihad against the French colonialists. In 1916, Kaocen's forces began attacking towns in the Aïr Mountains.  With the aid of the Sultan of Agadez, Kaocen's forces placed the garrison under siege on 17 December 1916.  They seized all the major towns of the  Aïr, including Ingall, Assodé, and Aouderas, placing what is today northern Niger under rebel control for over three months.

Defeat and death
On 3 March 1917 a large French force dispatched from Zinder relieved the Agadez garrison, and Kaocen's forces retreated to Tibesti, conducting raids against the French and local towns until he was eventually driven north to the Fezzan. There he was captured and hanged in 1919 by local forces in Mourzouk hostile to the Sanusiya.

Context
Today Kaocen is remembered by Tuareg nationalists as a hero, and his name is a popular given name in Tuareg communities. Memory of the revolt, and the killings in its wake, remain fresh in the minds of modern Tuareg. The episode is seen both as a part of a larger anti-colonial struggle, and amongst some as part of the post independence struggle for autonomy of the existing governments of Niger and its neighbors.

Conflicts have persisted since independence, with major Tuareg risings in Mali's Adrar des Ifoghas during 1963–64, the 1990s insurgencies in both Mali and Niger, and a renewed series of insurgencies beginning in the mid-2000s (see Second Tuareg Rebellion).

References

Samuel Decalo. Historical Dictionary of Niger. Scarecrow Press, London and New Jersey (1979). 
Jolijn Geels. Niger. Bradt London and Globe Pequot New York (2006). .
J. D. Fage,  Roland Anthony Oliver. The Cambridge History of Africa. Cambridge University Press (1975), p199. ISBN

Berber Nigeriens
History of Niger
Tuareg rebels
People of French West Africa
1880 births
1919 deaths
20th-century executions
People executed by hanging
Tuareg independence movement